Shishlik (Persian: شیشلیک‎) is a 2021 Iranian black comedy film directed by Mohammad Hossein Mahdavian and written by Amir Mahdi Jule. The film screened for the first time at the 39th Fajr Film Festival and received 4 nominations.

Plot 
A resident of a small town on the outskirts of Tehran, under the influence of special conditions imposed on him by the head of a factory, has revolted. He seeks the liberation of his family and..

Cast 
 Reza Attarn as Hashem
 Pejman Jamshidi as Ahmad
 Jamshid Hashempour as Hashem's Father
 Zhaleh Sameti as Atefeh
 Vahdi Rahbani as Motamedi, Hashem's Boss
 Mahlagha Bagheri as The School Principal
 Abbas Jamshidifar

Reception

Accolades

References

External links 

 

Iranian comedy films
2020s Persian-language films
2021 black comedy films